San Pedro is the Spanish language form of Saint Peter.  It can refer to:

Places

Argentina 
 San Pedro, Buenos Aires Province
 San Pedro, Capayán, Catamarca
 San Pedro, La Rioja
 San Pedro, Misiones
 San Pedro Partido, a partido located in the north of the Argentine province of Buenos Aires
 San Pedro Department, Misiones, the largest and most sparsely populated department in the Misiones Province, Argentina

Belize 
 San Pedro Town, a town on the island of Ambergris Caye

Bolivia 
 San Pedro prison or El penal de San Pedro, the largest prison in La Paz, Bolivia

Chile 
San Pedro de Atacama, a village in the Atacama desert of northern Chile
San Pedro de la Paz
San Pedro, Chile
San Pedro River (Chile)
San Pedro de Inacaliri River
San Pedro (Chile volcano)

Colombia 
San Pedro, Valle del Cauca, a town and municipality
San Pedro de Cartago, a town and municipality in the Nariño Department
San Pedro, Sucre

Costa Rica 
San Pedro, Costa Rica or San Pedro de Montes de Oca, a city in the canton of Montes de Oca, in San José province
San Pedro de Barva, a village and district in the canton of Barva in the province of Heredia

San Pedro de Poás, a city and district in the canton of Poás in the province of Alajuela
San Pedro de Santa Bárbara, a village and district in the canton of Santa Bárbara in the province of Heredia

Cuba 
 San Pedro River (Cuba), a river in Camagüey Province

Dominican Republic 
 San Pedro de Macorís Province, a province of the Dominican Republic, also the name of its capital city
 San Pedro de Macorís, capital of that province

Guatemala 
 San Pedro Carchá (Alta Verapaz)
 San Pedro Ayampuc (Guatemala dept.)
 San Pedro Sacatepéquez, Guatemala (Guatemala dept.)
 San Pedro Necta (Huehuetenango)
 San Pedro Pinula (Jalapa)
 San Pedro Jocopilas (Quiché)
 San Pedro La Laguna (Sololá)
 Volcán San Pedro

Honduras 
San Pedro de Copán (Copán)
San Pedro Sula (Cortés)
San Pedro de Tutule (La Paz)
San Pedro Zacapa (Santa Bárbara)
A prison in Honduras

Ivory Coast 
 San Pédro, Ivory Coast

Mexico 
San Pedro, Baja California Sur
San Pedro, Coahuila, a municipality
San Pedro Cholula (municipality), a municipality in the state of Puebla
San Pedro Garza García, in Nuevo León
San Pedro, Oaxaca (disambiguation), several places
San Pedro de la Cueva, in Sonora
San Pedro Ocotlán, in Zacatecas
Cerro de San Pedro, San Luis Potosí

Nicaragua 
San Pedro de Lóvago

Paraguay 
San Pedro Department, Paraguay, a department of Paraguay. The capital is the city of San Pedro de Ycuamandiyú
San Pedro de Ycuamandiyú, the capital of that department
San Pedro del Paraná

Peru 
 San Pedro de Lloc, city in La Libertad Region
 San Pedro de Tacna, capital of Tacna Region

Philippines 
San Pedro, Laguna, a city in Laguna, Philippines
San Pedro, Bagabag, a barangay in Nueva Vizcaya, Philippines
San Pedro Cutud, a barangay in San Fernando, Pampanga, Philippines
San Pedro Bay (Philippines), at the northwest end of Leyte Gulf
Fort San Pedro, a historic structure in Cebu, Philippines

Spain 
San Pedro, Spain (disambiguation)

United States 
San Pedro, Los Angeles, home to the Port of Los Angeles, located in San Pedro Bay
San Pedro, New Mexico, a former village across the Rio Grande from San Antonio, New Mexico
San Pedro Bay (California), an inlet on the Pacific Ocean coast of southern California, United States
San Pedro or Nacimiento Mountains, New Mexico
San Pedro River (Arizona), a northward-flowing stream originating about 10 miles (16 km) south of Sierra Vista, Arizona, near Cananea, Sonora, Mexico
San Pedro Valley (Arizona)

Other uses 
 Iglesia de San Pedro Mártir (Calatayud), a former church in Calatayud, Aragon, Spain
 San Pedro (ship), a shipwreck off Bermuda
 San Pedro cactus (Echinopsis pachanoi), native to South America
 The San Pedro, a ship that was intentionally sunk off of Honolulu, Hawaii by the Atlantis Submarine Company for an artificial reef; the wreck lies alongside the YO-257
 "San Pedro", a song from Mogwai's 2011 album Hardcore Will Never Die, But You Will
 San Pedro, a fictional island mentioned in Madonna's 1986 song "La Isla Bonita"

See also
 San Pedro Bay (disambiguation)
 San Pedro Island (disambiguation)
 San Pedro River (disambiguation)